Benzthiazide (BAN/INN, also known as benzothiazide; trade names Aquatag, Dihydrex, Diucen, Edemax, Exna, Foven and others) is a thiazide diuretic used in the treatment of high blood pressure and edema. It is no longer available in the United States.

In the United Kingdom, it was also sold in combination with the potassium-sparing diuretic triamterene under the trade name Dytide. The same combination is still available in Switzerland as Dyrenium compositum.

References

Sulfonamides
Thiazides
Benzothiadiazines
Chloroarenes
Thioethers
Carbonic anhydrase inhibitors